Joseph ben Meir Teomim (1727–1792; Hebrew: יוסף בן מאיר תאומים) was a Galician rabbi born at Lemberg.  While still young he succeeded his father in the position of preacher and rabbinical instructor in the yeshivah of Lemberg. Later he went to Berlin, where he stayed several years in the bet ha-midrash of Daniel Itzig. Then he resumed his former position at Lemberg, and in 1782 was appointed rabbi at Frankfurt an der Oder, where he remained until his death. He was buried in the Jewish cemetery at Frankfurt/Oder.

Works
Te'omim, who was one of the foremost rabbis of his time, was a thorough student of rabbinical literature, and was not unlearned in the secular sciences. He wrote:
 Pri Megadim (פרי מגדים), a  supercommentary on some of the major commentators on the Shulkhan Aruch: On the Orach chayyim section, he wrote the Mishbetzot Zahav, containing a supercommentary on David ben Samuel's Ṭurei Zahav, and the Eshel Avraham, on Avraham Gombiner's Magen Avraham (Frankfort-on-the-Oder, 1753).  On the Yoreh De'ah section, he wrote the Siftei Da'at, on Shabbethai Kohen's Siftei Kohen (ש"ך; Berlin, 1772) as well as continuing the Mishbetzot Zahav.
 Porat Yosef, novellæ on Yebamot and Ketubot, with rules for halakic decisions (Zolkiev, 1756)
 Ginnat Vradim, seventy rules for the comprehension of the Talmud (Frankfort-on-the-Oder, 1767)
 Tebat Gome, on the Sabbatical sections (Frankfort-on-the-Oder, 1782)
 Shoshanat ha-'Amakim, a methodology of the Talmud, published together with the preceding
 No'am Megadim, commentaries on the prayers, published with the prayer-book Hegyon Leb.
 Rosh Yosef, novellæ on Berachos, Shabbos, Megillah, and Chullin

Te'omim left in manuscript Sefer ha-Maggid (a commentary on the Torah and the Haftarot, sermons for Shabbat and festivals, and a twofold commentary on Pirḳe Abot) and Em la-Binah (a Hebrew, Aramaic, and Chaldaic lexicon; Neubauer, Cat. Bodl. Hebr. MSS. No. 1500). In the introduction to the last-named work Te'omim mentions a great number of writings of his own, on halakot and ethics, which are no longer in existence.

Bibliography and references

The following bibliography is referred to in the Jewish Encyclopedia article:
D. Cassel, in Ersch and Gruber, Encyc. section ii., part 31, p. 97;
Steinschneider, Cat. Bodl. col. 1534;
Neubauer, in Ha-Maggid, xiii. 285;
Fuenn, Keneset Yisrael, p. 514;
Buber, Anshe Shem, p. 95.

18th-century rabbis from the Russian Empire
1727 births
1793 deaths
Rabbis from Galicia (Eastern Europe)
Authors of books on Jewish law
Rabbis from Lviv
People from Frankfurt (Oder)